The 1991 edition of the Campeonato Carioca kicked off on August 3, 1991 and ended on December 19, 1991. It is the official tournament organized by FFERJ (Federação de Futebol do Estado do Rio de Janeiro, or Rio de Janeiro State Football Federation. Only clubs based in the Rio de Janeiro State are allowed to play. Twenty-four teams contested this edition. Flamengo won the title for the 23rd time. Miguel Couto and Nova Cidade were relegated.

System
The tournament would be divided in three stages:
 Taça Guanabara: The twenty-four teams were divided into two groups of twelve teams; Group A, with the ten best teams of last year's championship and the two best teams from the Second Level, and Group B, with the bottom two teams from the first level and the ten best non-promoted teams from the Second Level. each team played in a single round-robin format against the teams of their group. The champion of Group A qualified to the Finals. The bottom two teams of Group A were relegated to Group B and The top two teams of Group B were promoted to Group A. 
 Taça Rio: Each team played in a single round-robin format against the teams of their group. The champion of Group A qualified to the Finals. The bottom two teams of Group A were relegated to Group B and The top two teams of Group B were promoted to Group A for the next year. The bottom two teams of Group B were relegated to the Second Level.
 Finals: They would be disputed by the champions of Taça Guanabara and Taça Rio, in two matches.

Championship

Taça Guanabara

Group A

Group B

Taça Rio

Group A

Playoffs

Group B

Finals

References

Campeonato Carioca seasons
Carioca